Coleomegilla is a genus of lady beetles in the family Coccinellidae. There are at least two described species in Coleomegilla.

Species
These two species belong to the genus Coleomegilla:
 Coleomegilla cubensis (Casey, 1908)
 Coleomegilla maculata (De Geer, 1775) (pink spotted lady beetle)

References

Further reading

External links

 

Coccinellidae
Coccinellidae genera